Ladies Park is a 2011 Pakistani drama comedy serial broadcasting by Geo Entertainment. It is directed by Nadeem Baig and written by Muhammad Younis Butt, casting Mahnoor Baloch, Humayun Saeed, Nadia Hussain, Sana Askari, Asif Raza Mir, Arjumand Rahim, Shahood Alvi and Ayesha Omar. It was first aired on 22 February 2011.

Plot
The series revolves around the lives of four couples and their trials and tribulations. When Sonia, Saba, Natasha and Rubina meet in a park every day, they share each other's problems as they take their evening walk. Apart from recreation, this is a time when these women bare their souls to each other, console each other and in some cases even try to solve each other's problems by lending a helping hand; this often leads to hilariously catastrophic results.

Cast 
 Mahnoor Baloch as Soniya
 Humayun Saeed as Sarmad (Sarmi) 
 Nadia Hussain as Saba
 Asif Raza Mir Saba's husband 
 Arjumand Rahim as Rubina 
 Shahood Alvi as Kulsoom's husband 
 Sana Askari as Ayesha 
 Ayesha Omar as Natasha
 Hina Dilpazeer as Kulsoom 
 Azfar Rehman as Sam 
 Beo Zafar as Bee Jee 
Noor Hassan Rizvi as Sameer

References

External links 
 

Pakistani drama television series
Pakistani comedy television series
Geo TV original programming
Urdu-language television shows
2011 Pakistani television series debuts
Films directed by Nadeem Baig (director)